Dicepolia nigritinctalis is a moth in the family Crambidae. It was described by James E. Hayden in 2010. It is found in Cuba and Chiapas in Mexico.

The length of the forewings is 5–6 mm. The forewings are brownish orange to pale lemon yellow. The basal part of the costa is dark grey. The hindwings are smoky bronze or translucent greyish medially with white margins. Adults have been recorded on wing in June and July.

Etymology
The species name refers to the uniform dark grey distal forewing fringe.

References

Moths described in 2010
Odontiinae